The 1930 Singapore Open, also known as the 1930 Singapore Badminton Championships, took place from 5 July – 27 September 1930 at the S.V.C Drill Hall in City Hall, Singapore. The ties were played over a few months with the first round ties being played on the 5th of July and the last tie (the men's doubles final) was played on the 27th of September. There were no women-related competitions being held due to the lack of entries.

Defending men's singles champion, E.J. Vass won his second consecutive title after he bested See Gim Hock in a thrilling three sets battle to win the men's singles final. Lim Chek Heng and Seah Eng Liat became the competition first men's doubles champion when they defeated Lim Boon Guan and Wee Eng Siang in yet another three setter.

Final results

Men's singles

Seeds 

 E. J. Vass (Champion)
 See Gim Hock (Final)
 Yeo Kian Ann (Semi-finals)
 Seah Eng Liat (Semi-finals)

Men's doubles

References 

Singapore Open (badminton)
1930 in badminton